The Argentina census is a census mandated by the Argentina Constitution and takes place every 10 years since 1960. The first census was taken in 1869, under Domingo Faustino Sarmiento; there have been 11 federal censuses since that time. The most recent national census took place in 2022.

Since 1968, the National Institute of Statistics and Census of Argentina is the public body responsible of conducting the census.

History
Adapted from the official website.

Notes

References

Argentina
Demographics of Argentina